The Cross-country events have been contested at the Universiade since 1960.

Events

Medalists

Men

Individual sprint

10 km

12 km/15 km classical

Mass start 30 km

Combined/double pursuit/Skiathlon

Relay

Women

Individual sprint

5 km

8 km/10 km classical

Mass start 15 km

Combined/double pursuit/Skiathlon

Relay

Mixed

Team Sprint

Medal table 
Last updated after the 2023 Winter Universiade

References 

 
Universiade
Sports at the Winter Universiade
Nordic skiing at the Winter Universiade